Mirusuvil massacre  refers to the massacre and subsequent mass burial of eight Sri Lankan Tamil civilians on 20 December 2000.

The Massacre

The Mirusuvil massacre happened on 20 December 2000, when eight internally displaced refugees returning to inspect their property were arrested on 19 December 2000 in a village named Mirusuvil close to Jaffna.

They were subsequently murdered allegedly by Sri Lankan Army soldiers and buried in a mass grave, about 16 miles east of Jaffna town.

The refugees had returned from Udupiddy, further north. They returned to Mirusuvil on 19 December to inspect their houses and to collect firewood, when they were seized by the Army. The refugees had obtained permission from local authorities before visiting their former properties.

According to the evidence of District Medical Officer, Dr. C. Kathirvetpillai, their throats had been slashed. The dead included three teenagers and five-year-old Vilvarajah Prasath  The murders came to light because one of the arrested, Ponnuthurai Maheswaran allegedly escaped from Army custody with serious injuries and informed relatives. Eventually the Sri Lankan government charged five Sri Lankan Army soldiers with illegal arrests, torture, murder and burial of their dead bodies in a mass grave. The case was still pending in 2007.

Reactions
In a letter to the then President Chandrika Kumaratunga, the local member of parliament Mavai Senathirajah said that a woman’s body was seen partially buried in the area, leading to suspicions that there were other mass graves. He urged the president to order further excavations in Mirusuvil.

Human rights groups such as Center for Human Rights Development (CHRD) along with other civilian groups initiated a campaign and demanded the government to arrest the murderers and as a result 14 Sri Lanka Army Soldiers were taken into custody. They were produced before the Magistrate in Chavakachcheri, located in Jaffna district and remanded. CHRD lawyer Mr. M. Remadious was instrumental in participating in legal proceedings against the suspects and also met and interviewed the relatives of the victims to collect more information.

The case was then transferred to the Magistrate Court in Anuradhapura and was taken up on 20 May 2002. Attorney General then nominated three Judges to hear the case at Trial at Bar, High court, Colombo on 27 November 2002. Group of volunteer lawyers took care of the interests of the victim’s families and key witnesses.

Later the case was referred to the Colombo High Court and it longed for about 13 years.

Case follow up

The government in 2002 agreed to try the arrested army officers without a jury. During the proceedings of the court case the main witness in the court case was quoted as saying that: 

Although the case was still being heard in 2005, Human rights agencies have complained of delays in hearing of this and other human rights related cases.

Death Sentence
Initially 14 Soldiers were taken into custody and later nine of them were acquitted from all charges. But after Attorney General had filed charges against 5 soldiers in connection with this case.

After about 13 years of the case, the first accused army Staff Sergeant Sunil Ratnayake was found guilty for the murder of eight civilians in Mirusuvil, Jaffna has been sentenced to death by the Colombo High Court on 25 June 2015. He was found guilty of 15 offences. However, four other soldiers were acquitted as there was insufficient evidence to connect them to the murders.

Pardon
In January 2020 it was alleged by opposition MP Ajith Perera that Sunil Ratnayake who was on death row over the massacre was going to be pardoned and "applauded" the move. On 26 March 2020 Ratnanayake was granted a full presidential pardon which was condemned by human rights groups and the Tamil National Alliance. However Ajith P Perera's official Twitter account replying to a tweet by Sumanthiran clarified that the original comment was meant to be sarcastic and condemned the release. Former Army Commander Sarath Fonseka also criticised the decision claiming that the military should never show mercy to soldiers who committed murder.

Notes

See also
The Holocaust
Genocide of indigenous peoples

References

External links
Mirusuvil case proceedings Feb 2003
Mirusuvil case proceedings Feb(2) 2003
Mirusuvil case proceedings March 2003
Mirusuvil case proceedings May 2003
Mirusuvil case proceedings June 2003
The other Mirusuvil massacre by UTHR - report 10
Location of the Mirusuvil mass grave

2000 crimes in Sri Lanka
Attacks on civilians attributed to the Sri Lanka Army
Massacres in Sri Lanka
Mass graves in Sri Lanka
Mass murder in 2000
Mass murder of Sri Lankan Tamils
Sri Lankan government forces attacks in Eelam War III
Terrorist incidents in Sri Lanka in 2000